Gregory Damons (born 13 June 1995) is a South African soccer player who plays as a defender for South African Premier Division side Moroka Swallows.

Early and personal life
Damons was born in Gelvandale, Port Elizabeth as the younger of two children and attended Gelvandale High School and later Western Cape Sports School, having been awarded a scholarship there after playing in the Engen Knockout Challenge. After leaving school, he worked in the reception at St George's Hospital to pay for his transport fares to attend trials. He married Tiffany Gabriella in December 2020.

Career
After playing for FC Callies in the SAFA Regional League, he joined the reserve team of Chippa United in 2014. In January 2018, Damons was promoted to Chippa United's senior team. Damons made his debut for the club on 14 August 2019 in a 1–1 draw with Mamelodi Sundowns; a performance for which he was awarded the Man of the Match award. Across the 2019–20 season, Damons made 21 league appearances for the club.

References

1995 births
Living people
South African soccer players
Sportspeople from Port Elizabeth
Association football defenders
Chippa United F.C. players
Cape Town Spurs F.C. players
Moroka Swallows F.C. players
South African Premier Division players
National First Division players
Soccer players from the Eastern Cape